Anthoptilidae is a family of corals belonging to the order Pennatulacea.

Genera:
 Anthoptilum Kölliker, 1880
 Benthoptillum Verrill, 1885

References

Pennatulacea
Cnidarian families